Léon Charles Albert Calmette ForMemRS (12 July 1863 – 29 October 1933) was a French physician, bacteriologist and immunologist, and an important officer of the Pasteur Institute. He discovered the Bacillus Calmette-Guérin, an attenuated form of Mycobacterium bovis used in the BCG vaccine against tuberculosis. He also developed the first antivenom for snake venom, the Calmette's serum.

Early career
Calmette was born in Nice, France. He wanted to serve in the Navy and be a physician, so in 1881 he joined the School of Naval Physicians at Brest. He started to serve in 1883 in the Naval Medical Corps in Hong Kong, where he worked with Dr Patrick Manson, who studied the mosquito transmission of the parasitic worm, filaria, the cause of elephantiasis. Calmette completed his medical degree on the subject of filariasis.  He was then assigned to Saint-Pierre and Miquelon, where he arrived in 1887. Afterwards, he served in West Africa, in Gabon and French Congo, where he researched malaria, sleeping sickness and pellagra.

Association with Pasteur
Upon his return to France in 1890, Calmette met Louis Pasteur (1822–1895) and Emile Roux (1853–1933), who was his professor in a course on bacteriology. He became an associate and was charged by Pasteur to found and direct a branch of the Pasteur Institute at Saigon (French Indochina), in 1891. There, he dedicated himself to the nascent field of toxicology, which had important connections to immunology, and he studied snake and bee venom, plant poisons and curare.  He also organized the production of vaccines against smallpox and rabies and carried out research on cholera, and the fermentation of opium and rice.

In 1894, he came back to France again and develop the first antivenoms for snake bites using immune sera from vaccinated horses (Calmette's serum). Work in this field was later taken up by Brazilian physician Vital Brazil, in São Paulo at the Instituto Butantan, who developed several other antivenoms against snakes, scorpions and spiders.

He also took part in the development in the first immune serum against the bubonic plague (black pest), in collaboration with the discoverer of its pathogenic agent, Yersinia pestis, by Alexandre Yersin (1863–1943), and went to Portugal to study and to help fight a plague epidemic at Oporto in 1899.

Institute leadership
In 1895, Roux entrusted him with the directorship of the Institute's branch at Lille (Institut Pasteur de Lille), where he was to remain for the next 25 years. In 1901, he founded the first antituberculosis dispensary at Lille, and named it after Emile Roux. In 1904, he founded the "Ligue du Nord contre la Tuberculose" (Northern Antituberculosis League), which still exists today.

In 1909, he helped to establish the Institute branch in Algiers (Algeria). In 1918, he accepted the post of assistant director of the Institute in Paris; the following year he was made a member of the Académie Nationale de Médecine.

Research on tuberculosis

Calmette's main scientific work, which was to bring him worldwide fame and his name permanently attached to the history of medicine was the attempt to develop a vaccine against tuberculosis, which, at the time, was a major cause of death. The German microbiologist Robert Koch had discovered, in 1882, that the tubercle bacillus, Mycobacterium tuberculosis, was its pathogenic agent, and Louis Pasteur became interested in it too. In 1906, a veterinarian and immunologist, Camille Guérin, had established that immunity against tuberculosis was associated with the living tubercle bacilli in the blood. Using Pasteur's approach, Calmette investigated how immunity would develop in response to attenuated bovine bacilli injected in animals. This preparation received the name of its two discoverers (Bacillum Calmette-Guérin, or BCG, for short). Attenuation was achieved by cultivating them in a bile-containing substrate, based on idea given by a Norwegian researcher, Kristian Feyer Andvord (1855–1934). From 1908 to 1921, Guérin and Calmette strived to produce less and less virulent strains of the bacillus, by transferring them to successive cultures. Finally, in 1921, they used BCG to successfully vaccinate newborn infants in the Hôpital de la Charité in Paris.

The vaccination program, however, suffered a serious setback when 72 vaccinated children developed tuberculosis in 1930, in Lübeck, Germany, due to a contamination of some batches in Germany. Mass vaccination of children was reinstated in many countries after 1932, when new and safer production techniques were implemented. Notwithstanding, Calmette was deeply shaken by the event, dying one year later, in Paris.

Impact on industrial brewing 
Calmette helped develop the amylolytic process which was used in industrial brewing.

Personal life
He was the brother of Gaston Calmette (1858–1914), the editor of Le Figaro who was shot and killed in 1914 by Henriette Caillaux.
Mme Caillaux was acquitted of murder on the grounds that she had committed a crime of passion.

Legacy
Today, his name is one of the few remaining French names in the streets of Ho Chi Minh City (others being Yersin, Alexandre de Rhodes, Pasteur).
A new bridge (completed in 2009) is also named "Calmette" connecting district 1 to district 4, also connected to the exit of the new Thu Thiem tunnel connecting the district 1 to the future residential Thu Thiem area in district 2. In Cambodia, a major hospital was named after him, Calmette Hospital.

References

Bibliography

External links
 
 Léon Charles Albert Calmette. WhoNamedIt site.
 Albert Calmette (1863–1933). Repères Chronologiques. Institut Pasteur, Paris (In French).
 

1863 births
1933 deaths
People from Nice
Scientists from Lille
French bacteriologists
French pulmonologists
Academic staff of the University of Lille Nord de France
Members of the French Academy of Sciences
Foreign Members of the Royal Society
French Navy officers